The Catholic Church in Equatorial Guinea is part of the worldwide Catholic Church, under the spiritual leadership of the Pope in Rome.

Equatorial Guinea has one of the highest proportions of Catholics in Africa, a legacy of its status as a former Spanish colony. There are five dioceses, including one archdiocese.

In 2005, about 422,000 (87%) of the 485,000 inhabitants of Equatorial Guinea were member of the Catholic Church. Equatorial Guinea consists of a single ecclesiastical province, Malabo, with four suffragan dioceses in Bata, Ebebiyin, Evinayong and Mongomo. The Archdiocese of Malabo has the Archbishop of Malabo as metropolitan archbishop and spiritual leader of the catholic faithful of Equatorial Guinea. The current archbishop of Malabo is Nsue Edjang Mayé, former bishop of Ebebiyin. The emeritus archbishop is Ildefonso Obama Obono.

The bishops are members of the Episcopal Conference of Equatorial Guinea (Conferencia Episcopal de Guinea Ecuatorial). President of the Episcopal Conference is Ildefonso Obama Obono, archbishop of Malabo. Furthermore, the Episcopal Conference is a member of the Association des Conferences Episcopales de l'Afrique Centrale and the Symposium des Conférences Épiscopales d'Afrique et de Madagascar.

On April 1, 2017, the Holy See erected two new dioceses in Equatorial Guinea. The Diocese of Evinayong was erected from territories formerly belonging to the Diocese of Bata and the Diocese of Mongomo was carved out of the current Diocese of Ebebiyin.

The Apostolic Nuncio to Equatorial Guinea since March 29, 2018 is Archbishop Julio Murat, the titular archbishop of Orange.

Archdiocese

 Archdiocese of Malabo

Dioceses

Diocese of Bata
Diocese of Ebebiyin
Diocese of Evinayong
Diocese of Mongomo

Nuncios

Apostolic Pro-Nuncio

 Archbishop Luigi Poggi (31 October 1966 - 21 May 1969 later Cardinal)
 Archbishop Ernesto Gallina (July 16, 1969 - March 13, 1971)
 Archbishop Jean Jadot (15 May 1971 - 23 May 1973)
 Archbishop Luciano Storero (30 June 1973 - 14 July 1976)
 Archbishop Giuseppe Uhac (October 7, 1976 - June 3, 1981)
 Archbishop Donato Squicciarini (16 September 1981 - 1 July 1989)
 Archbishop Santos Abril y Castelló (2 October 1989 - 24 February 1996)

Apostolic Nuncio

 Archbishop Félix del Blanco Prieto (4 May 1996 - 28 June 1996)
 Archbishop Eliseo Antonio Ariotti (17 July 2003 - 5 November 2009)
 Archbishop Piero Pioppo (January 25, 2010 - September 8, 2017)
 Archbishop Julio Murat (since March 29, 2018)

See also
 Basilica of Sts. Peter and Paul, Dillingen

References

Equatorial Guinea